Rabbit Don't Come Easy is the tenth studio album by German power metal band Helloween, released in 2003. It is the first Helloween album to feature Sascha Gerstner on guitars, who replaced Roland Grapow. No drummer is listed in the band line-up for this album. Mark Cross was hired for the position before recording, but only managed to complete two tracks ("Don't Stop Being Crazy" and "Listen to the Flies") before being forced to leave due to illness. Mikkey Dee of Motörhead played on the rest of the songs on a session basis. The Japanese version contains a cover of Accept's "Fast as a Shark", with the band's new drummer, Stefan Schwarzmann.

Commenting on Dee's performance, bassist Markus Grosskopf said:

About the album title, bassist Markus Grosskopf explained in 2003 that "It's based on that English saying, pulling a rabbit out of the hat. Pulling this rabbit [the album] out of this hat [in reference to recent line up changes] wasn't that easy this time. That gave us the idea of just calling the album Rabbit Don't Come Easy. [Laughs] It's not to be taken too seriously. We were joking that statement around, and then I suggested we actually call the album that".

About the recording of the album, singer Andi Deris said in 2003 that producer Charlie Bauerfeind "shows on this new record that he is the biggest fan of our genre of music because he knows how to separate the frequencies and knows where the power has to be. You have to imagine that this type of music is so packed with frequencies that it is nearly impossible to mix because it is so overloaded and you have to single out all of the instruments so you can hear them all".

After the controversial release of The Dark Ride, according to Grosskopf, "The record company also wanted us to show that we are back. This song "Just a Little Sign" represents the more typical side of Helloween, and that's what we wanted to make clear. You can't really represent a whole album with one track, but this shows exactly where the album actually goes. It's more of that 'happy happy Helloween' direction. It shows that this album is not a sequel to 'The Dark Ride'".

Track listing

Personnel
 Helloween

Andi Deris - vocals
Michael Weikath - guitar
Sascha Gerstner - guitar
Markus Grosskopf - bass

 Additional musicians
Mark Cross - drums on tracks 7, 11
Mikkey Dee - drums on tracks 1-6, 8-10, 12
Stefan Schwarzmann - drums on tracks 13, 14 (bonus tracks)

Charts

References

2003 albums
Helloween albums
Nuclear Blast albums
Albums produced by Charlie Bauerfeind